The lyre-tailed king bird-of-paradise, also known as the lyre-tailed king, lonely little king or crimson bird-of-paradise, is a bird in the family Paradisaeidae that is a hybrid between a king bird-of-paradise and magnificent bird-of-paradise.

History
At least three adult male specimens are known of this hybrid, coming from an altitude of 1000 m in the Cyclops Mountains, near Humboldt Bay on the northern coast of New Guinea, as well as unknown localities.

Notes

References
 
 

Hybrid birds of paradise
Birds of New Guinea